Te Tai Rawhiti was one of the five new New Zealand parliamentary Māori electorates created in  for MMP. It largely replaced its English-named predecessor, Eastern Maori, though Te Tai Rawhiti's boundary was retracted significantly in the central North Island. 

Population centres

The electorate was based in the Bay of Plenty and East Cape regions, as well as parts of eastern Waikato, and included the following population centres:
 Edgecumbe
 Kawerau
 Morrinsville
 Murupara
 Ōpōtiki
 Putāruru
 Rotorua
 Te Aroha
 Tauranga
 Tokoroa
 Tolaga Bay
 Whakatāne

Tribal areas
The electorate included the following tribal areas:
 Ngāti Ranginui
Ngāi Te Rangi
Te Arawa
Ngāti Awa
Ngāi Tūhoe
Whakatohea
Ngāi Tai
Te Whānau-ā-Apanui
Ngāti Kahungunu ki Wairoa
Ngāti Tūwharetoa
Ngāti Porou
Ngāti Ruapani
Te Aitanga-a-Hauiti

History
Te Tai Rawhiti was one of the five new Māori electorates created for the 1996 election with the introduction of mixed-member proportional (MMP) representation, and which were all won by the Tight Five of New Zealand First.

In the  it was substantially replaced by Waiariki.

Members of Parliament
Key

List MPs

Election results

1996 election

References

Historical Māori electorates
1996 establishments in New Zealand
1999 disestablishments in New Zealand